The 2017 Vietnam Open was a professional tennis tournament played on hard courts. It is the third edition of the tournament which is part of the 2017 ATP Challenger Tour. It takes place in Ho Chi Minh City, Vietnam between 23 and 29 October 2017.

Singles main-draw entrants

Seeds

Other entrants
The following players received wildcards into the singles main draw:
  Taylor Fritz
  Marinko Matosevic
  Phạm Minh Tuấn
  Trịnh Linh Giang

The following player received entry into the singles main draw using a protected ranking:
  Saketh Myneni

The following players received entry from the qualifying draw:
  Raphael Baltensperger
  Vasko Mladenov
  Jakub Paul
  Vadym Ursu

The following player received entry as a lucky loser:
  Timur Khabibulin

Champions

Singles

  Mikhail Youzhny def.  John Millman 6–4, 6–4.

Doubles

  Saketh Myneni /  Vijay Sundar Prashanth def.  Ben McLachlan /  Go Soeda 7–6(7–3), 7–6(7–5).

2017 ATP Challenger Tour
2017